Alan Pearson (1929–2019) was a neo-expressionist painter who lived in New Zealand and, in his later life, Australia.

Life and work 

Pearson studied at the University of Canterbury School of Fine Arts (1957-59), and then lived most of his life in Christchurch, New Zealand, moving to Australia in 2000.

Throughout his career, Alan Pearson exhibited in public and private art galleries across New Zealand and Australia, including a retrospective Heaven and Blood at Christchurch Art Gallery in 1999. His work is in private and public collections and he has been the subject of several publications.

Pearson is known for his expressive and gestural paintings which encapsulate a passionate demeanour and love of music, landscape and people. Pearson painted portraits of many of his friends, family and colleagues. He also chronicled and immortalised himself in numerous self portraits, scrutinising the artist's psyche;

"I'm looking into the inner person, talking with the individual and discovering a collection of inner thoughts which come together in their face" - Alan Pearson (The Press Christchurch)

Awards 

 1958 - Rosa Sawtell Prize for drawing
 1959 - Bickerton-Widdowson Scholarship
 1964 - Queen Elizabeth II Arts Council of New Zealand scholarship to study at Royal Academy Schools, London.
 1976 - Queen Elizabeth II Arts Council of New Zealand travel scholarship
 1978 - National Bank Portrait Award. 1st prize for Herne Bay Couple
 1979 - National Bank Portrait Award. 1st prize for Portrait of Mrs Oliver
 1986 - Artist in residence, Otago Polytechnic School of Fine Art, Dunedin Public Art Gallery.
 1989 - Queen Elizabeth II Arts Council of New Zealand travel grant to Australia.
 1993 - Artist in residence Tai Poutini Polytechnic, Greymouth (grant, Queen Elizabeth II Arts Council of New Zealand)

Collections 

 Aigantighe Art Gallery, Timaru
 Alexander Turnbull Library, The National Library of New Zealand, Wellington
 Auckland City Art Gallery
 Chartwell Collection, Auckland
 Christchurch Art Gallery (formerly Robert McDougall Art Gallery) Christchurch
 Dunedin Public Art Gallery
 Forrester Gallery, Oamaru
 Hocken Collections, University of Otago Library, Dunedin
 James Wallace Trust
 Middlesbrough Institute of Modern Art, Cleveland, England
 Museum of New Zealand, Te Papa Tongarewa, Wellington
 New Zealand Film Archive
 New Zealand Portrait Gallery, Wellington
 Suter Art Gallery, Nelson
 Te Manawa Museum, (formerly Manawatu Art Gallery),Palmerston North
 The Rutherford Trust Collection, Wellington
 The Todd Corporation Art Collection, Wellington
 University of Otago Medical School, Auckland
 University of Otago, Dunedin
 Waikato Museum of Art and History, Hamilton

References 

1929 births
2019 deaths
20th-century New Zealand male artists
21st-century New Zealand male artists
Ilam School of Fine Arts alumni
People from Christchurch